The Swedish Ice Hockey Championship (capitalised Swedish Championship) is a former Swedish ice hockey knockout tournament that was played every year between 1922 and 1951 and determined the Swedish ice hockey champions. The inaugural Championship winners were IK Göta. IK Göta also went on to become the tournament's most successful team, winning nine titles while the tournament was a standalone competition until 1953. After 1926 the winners were awarded the Le Mat Trophy. This trophy is currently awarded the winners of the Swedish Hockey League playoffs.

Winners

References